Reef safe is a distinction used in the saltwater aquarium hobby to indicate that a fish or invertebrate is safe to add to a reef aquarium. There is no fish that is completely reef safe. Every fish that is commonly listed as reef safe are species that usually do not readily consume small fish or invertebrates. Fish listed as reef safe also do not bother fellow fish unless in some cases, for instance tangs, they do not get along with conspecifics and sometimes fish with similar color or body shape. Every fish has a personality, is different, and, in some cases, are opportunistic feeders. Tangs, which by most accounts are reef safe, may in adulthood eat some crustaceans shortly after they molt. Many larger predatory fish, for instance eels and pufferfish, will adapt very well to a reef tank and will be problem-free as long as they have sizable tank-mates and no crustaceans. Some aquarists have also had success in keeping smaller fish with predatory ones in reef tanks by adding the smaller fish at night, sometimes with newly rearranged rockwork.

Reef safe

Fish 
 Anthias
 Basslets
 Blennies Excludes fang blennies. A few species will nip at polyps and giant clam mantles.
 Cardinalfish
 Chromis
 Clownfish Excludes the maroon clown which can grow very aggressive and territorial.
 Damsels Excludes larger, more aggressive Dascyllus varieties.
 Dwarf angelfish Dwarf angelfish in a reef setting has been heavily debated.
 Dottybacks They may consume small shrimp and can be highly aggressive.
 Dragonets
 Foxface Foxface and rabbitfish will occasionally eat certain corals if underfed.
 Gobies
 Jawfish
 Pipefish They can be killed by stinging corals and anemones.
 Pseudochromis They may consume small shrimp and can be highly aggressive.
 Seahorses They can be killed by stinging corals and anemones.
 Tangs
 Wrasse There are both reef safe wrasses and ones that are notorious for killing small fish and invertebrates.
 Planktivorous Triggerfish With caution.
 Melichthys spp.
 Xanthichthys spp.
 Odonus spp.

Invertebrates 
 Corals (Class Anthozoa) There are aggressive types of coral which have sweeper tentacles that can burn other corals. These may require specific placement in an aquarium.
 Crabs Specifically small hermit crabs, anemone crabs, emerald mithrax crabs, and strawberry crabs.
 Fan worms (Suborder Sabellida)
 Giant clams
 Scallops
 Sea anemones (Order Actiniaria) Anemones, especially carpet anemones can eat fish and burn corals to death requiring specific placement for specimens in an aquarium.
 Sea cucumbers
 Sea fans
 Sea slugs
 Starfish / Sea stars There are many starfish which are not reef safe like crown-of-thorns starfish and chocolate chip sea star.
 Shrimps Peppermint shrimps, cleaner shrimps,  pistol shrimps, anemone shrimps and blood red fire shrimps are better choices since the commonly available banded coral shrimp can kill fish, and the mantis shrimp will kill and eat most animals in a tank.
 Snails Some snails are parasitic but are rarely, if ever, offered in the saltwater aquaria trade.
 Sponges
 Tunicates (sea squirts)

Reef unsafe

Fish 
 Non-dwarf Angelfish This includes any of the larger angelfish.
 Non-planktivorous Butterflyfish Eat mainly or exclusively coral polyps
 Non-planktivorous Triggerfish This includes most triggerfish. Most triggerfish are highly aggressive carnivores that will eat many smaller fish and invertebrates in an aquarium. They also grow to be quite large.

Invertebrates 
 Sea apples Currently short-lived in aquaria. They release a highly-toxic substance at death, decimating the aquarium.

References 
 

Fishkeeping